Soylent may refer to:

 Soylent, a type of food eaten in the 1966 Harry Harrison science fiction novel Make Room! Make Room!
 Soylent Green, a 1973 American dystopian thriller film directed by Richard Fleischer (partly based on the novel)
 "Soylent Green", a song on Wumpscut's 1993 album Music for a Slaughtering Tribe
 Soylent Communications, owner of the NNDB biographical database
 Soylent (meal replacement), a brand of meal replacement products available in the United States

See also
 Soilent Green, an American extreme metal band
 Soilent Grün, a punk band